Sethji is an Indian drama television series produced by Offshore Productions. The show premiered on ZEE TV.

it replaced Kaala Teeka and was replaced by Jeet Gayi Toh Piya Morey in its original time slot. Shortly after the time slot change, it went off the air.

Plot
The show is based on the life of a young boy, Bajirao who belongs to a village in Maharashtra, ruled by Sethji, a strong-headed traditional lady. However, when he falls in love with modern Pragati, it creates ripples across the village.

Cast
 Gurdeep Kohli as Sethji/Ahilya Devi
Avinash Mishra as Baji/Bajirao
 Rumman Ahmed as Pragati
 Nadeem Khan as Sethji/Vinayak Rao
 Savi Thakur as Raghoji
 Divya Bhatnagar
 Amol Bawdekar
 Worshipp Khanna as Ganesh Rao
 Riya Chand
 Danish Bhatt
 Anurag
 Ayush Gautam
 Neha Solanki
 Aprajita Singh

References

2017 Indian television series debuts
Hindi-language television shows
Indian television soap operas
Indian drama television series
Television shows set in Maharashtra
Zee TV original programming